The South Division One (currently known as the 'Marine Harvest South Division 1' for sponsorship reasons) is the third tier of the Shinty league system. League champions are awarded the Dunn Cup and play-off against the North Division One champions for promotion to the National Division.

Current Teams 
The 2018 Marine Harvest South Division 1 will consist of the following teams:

*Denotes Reserve team
*Lochside Rovers are the 2nd team for Premiership side Oban Camanachd*

Aberdour Shinty Club
Ballachulish Camanachd Club
Bute Shinty Club
Col-Glen Shinty Club
Inveraray Shinty Club 2nd*
Kilmory Camanachd
Kyles Athletic Shinty Club 2nd*
Lochside Rovers* 
Tayforth Camanachd
Taynuilt Shinty Club

History

1980's: South Division One the top tier of Shinty. National final between winner of North Division One and South Division One.

1996 to 1999: Winners of North Division One and South Division One playing in National final with eventual winner gaining promotion to Premier Division.

1999 to 2006: National Division One becomes third tier of shinty with advent of National Division One. Winners of North Division One and South Division One playing in National final with eventual winner gaining promotion to National Division One (2nd tier).

2007: South Division One once again becomes the second tier of Shinty with the folding of National Division One. Champions guaranteed promotion to the Premier Division.

2014: South Division One once again becomes the third tier of Shinty with the reinstatement of National Division One with South Division One champions being promoted through a play-off win.

List of winners (since 2014)

2014 - Ballachulish Camanachd Club
2015 - Bute Shinty Club
2016 - Oban Celtic
2017 - Lochside Rovers
2018 - Season in progress

References

External links
Marine Harvest North Division One

Shinty competitions